The 2017 CONMEBOL South American Beach Soccer League was the first edition of the South American Beach Soccer League (named natively in Spanish as the CONMEBOL Liga Sudamericana de Fútbol Playa), a continental league competition for South American men's national beach soccer teams. Organised by the governing body for South American football, CONMEBOL, as part of its Development Department's Evolution Program, all ten members of the continental confederation took part, with both senior and Under 20s teams participating in the league events.

The teams were first divided into two geographically based zones (North and South) to compete in a round robin tournament against other members of their own zone. The winners of each zone then proceeded to face each other in the Finals to contest the title.

The regular season events took place in September 2017, whilst, due to delays, the finals did not take place until October 2018.

Brazil won the league after, as North zone champions, they defeated South zone champions Paraguay in the finals.

Format
The league operates under the following format:
The ten nations have been split into two zones, North and South, comprising five nations each. 
Each zone hosts one round of fixtures involving all five nations of said zone, split into two categories of matches; a set of matches contested between the senior representative teams and a set of matches contested between the Under 20s teams. 
Teams compete in round robin format exclusively against other teams in their own category. 
Points earned by the nations in both the senior and the Under 20s matches are combined into one single cumulative table.
The nation top of the table with the most points after all matches are completed are deemed zone champions. The winning nations of each zone's event proceed to the Finals. 
In the Finals, the North zone champion will face the South zone champion in both senior team fixtures and Under 20s team fixtures. 
The victors of these matches will be crowned league champions.

Calendar

Teams

Ten nations have sent two teams each, a senior representative squad and an Under 20s representative squad. In total, 20 teams will compete.

North zone

South zone

North zone

The North zone regular season event took place in the Peruvian capital of Lima. All matches were hosted in a purpose built arena on Agua Dulce Beach in the district of Chorrillos, organised in cooperation with the Peruvian Football Federation.

Matches are listed as local time in Lima, PET (UTC-5).

Standings

Results

Senior category

Under 20s category

South zone
The South zone regular season event took place in the Paraguayan city of Lambare, Gran Asunción. All matches were hosted at the Central Court of the Resort Yacht y Golf Club Paraguayo on the banks of Paraguay River, organised in cooperation with the Paraguayan Football Association. The matches were originally scheduled to take place at Ñu Guasú Park in Luque.

Matches are listed as local time in Lambare, PYT (UTC-4).

Standings

Results

Senior category

Under 20s category

Finals

The zone winners play each other for the league title; their senior teams play each other over two legs, as do their under 20s representatives for a total of four matches comprising the finals. The winners are the nation which accumulates the most points from all four matches combined.

Originally, the finals were scheduled for May 2018 in Xiamen, China. However, due to a last minute decision by the organisers, the finals were postponed on April 30 until after the 2018 FIFA World Cup.

After considering the Bahamas as the new venue, and Rosario, Argentina, the finals were eventually scheduled to take place in Rio de Janeiro, Brazil from 5–6 October.

All matches took place at a purpose built arena at Barra Olympic Park, just outside the Olympic Tennis Centre.

Matches are listed as local time in Rio de Janeiro, BRT (UTC-3).

Matches 

Brazil earn three points; Brazil lead the series 3–0

Brazil earn three points; Brazil lead the series 6–0

Brazil earn three points; Brazil lead the series an unassailable 9–0

Brazil earn three points; Brazil win the series 12–0

Winners 
Brazil claimed a clean sweep in the finals, winning all four matches to win the series 12 points to nil.

With an unassailable lead after match three, the final match was played as a dead rubber.

Awards 
Two individual awards were presented after the last match:

Source

References

External links
Liga Sudamericana de Fútbol Playa CONMEBOL, Beach Soccer Worldwide 
Liga Sudamericana de Futsal y Fútbol Playa – Regulations, CONMEBOL (in Spanish)

South American Beach Soccer League
2017 in beach soccer
2017 in South American football
2018 in beach soccer
2018 in South American football
2017 in Peruvian sport
2017 in Paraguayan sport
2018 in Brazilian sport